Lewin's Mead Unitarian meeting house is a former Unitarian church in Bristol, England.

The building
The meeting house was constructed in 1788–1791 in Lewin's Mead on the site of a 1705 chapel; before that, the site had been a Franciscan monastery. The chapel was designed in the Neoclassical style by William Blackburn. It was built to hold 400 people, with stables and coach-house. A lecture room was added in 1818, and schoolrooms in 1826. (Another source says 1000 people.)

A Grade II* listed building since 1959, it was converted to offices in 1987 by Feilden Clegg architects, and housed the offices of a construction consultancy, Provelio.

In January 2017 it was purchased by Emmanuel Bristol, a family of Church of England churches, for its city centre congregation.

The congregation and ministers

In the eighteenth century, the congregation was wealthy.

One notable minister, from 1817 to 1839, was Lant Carpenter, the father of social reformer Mary Carpenter.

Unitarians continue to meet in Bristol at their other places of worship, Frenchay Chapel and Brunswick Square.

References

See also
 Grade II* listed buildings in Bristol

Churches completed in 1791
Churches in Bristol
Grade II* listed churches in Bristol
Unitarian chapels in England
Franciscan monasteries in England